The Rivalry: Red V. Blue is a 2013 documentary film directed by Rory Owen Delaney and produced by Wm. Wade Smith. It is the first film to document the famous college basketball's rivalry of the University of Louisville vs. University of Kentucky. The film weaves current events, including back-to-back national championships in 2012 and 2013, with the history of a rivalry game that didn't even exist for decades. From 1959 to 1983, the two basketball teams refused to meet on the hard court.

Red V. Blue features interviews with coaches, players and personalities, including Denny Crum, Joe B. Hall, Derek Anderson, Luke Whitehead, Jim Host and John Y. Brown, among others.

Synopsis

Red V. Blue is a documentary about the instate rivalry between the University of Kentucky and the University of Louisville, the two most prominent universities in the state of Kentucky. The universities are located in the state's two largest cities, respectively the second-largest city of Lexington and the largest city, Louisville, and are separated by 75 miles of Interstate 64. But this is the least of their differences.

The close geographic proximity of the schools to each other has bred an intense rivalry, a rivalry made even more contentious by the national success of both college basketball programs. The two schools have won a combined 11 NCAA Division I basketball championships between them (the University of Kentucky has eight championships and the University of Louisville has three). However, the rivalry between the Wildcats and the Cardinals runs much deeper than geographical proximity.

Unlike many of college basketball's other great rivalries, such as Duke and North Carolina, or Purdue and Indiana, the University of Kentucky and the University of Louisville do not play in the same conference and have only one scheduled meeting a year. Theirs is a rivalry that is not born simply of familiarity or from battling year after year for the conference crown; it starts and ends with basketball bragging rights in a state that is more religiously devoted to basketball than to almost anything else.

The Kentucky and Louisville basketball teams met for the first time in 1913 but rarely played each other for the following 70 years. A somewhat improbable matchup in the 1983 Elite Eight between the No. 2 ranked Cardinals and the No.12 ranked Wildcats, however, sent the Bluegrass State in to a frenzy. Fans from both schools refer to this post regular season clash between the two storied programs in 1983 as the "Dream Game." In the game itself, after regulation time ended with Kentucky tying the game at the "buzzer," Louisville went on to dominate the overtime and ran out as comfortable 80–68 winners. This was the defining moment in this rivalry. The result of this game lead directly to the start of the "Battle for the Bluegrass" annual series between the two schools that November. But it took the best personal efforts of the then Governor of Kentucky John Y. Brown, Jr. to put these two universities, separated by 75 miles of freeway, back on the basketball court.

Cast
The film features interviews with Denny Crum, Joe B. Hall, Jim Host, John Y. Brown, Van Vance, Jock Sutherland, Tom Leach, Matt Jones, Mike Rutherford, Russ Smith, Gorgui Dieng, Mayor Greg Fischer, Mayor Jim Gray, Mayor Bob Porter, Terry Howard, Rob Bromley, Al Benniger, Jim Tharp, Tony Vanetti, Pat Forde, Derek Anderson, Oscar Combs, Luke Whitehead, Scott Padgett, James Boo Brewer, Peyton Siva, Bill Mike Runyon, Landon Slone, and Attorney Jonathan C. Shaw.

See also
 Kentucky–Louisville rivalry

References

External links
  
 

2013 films
American sports documentary films
Documentary films about basketball
Films shot in Kentucky
Louisville Cardinals men's basketball
Kentucky Wildcats men's basketball
Documentary films about Kentucky
2010s English-language films
2010s American films